Vladimír Bednár (born 8 December 1979) is a Slovak retired footballer.

References
 

1979 births
Living people
Slovak footballers
Slovak expatriate footballers
1. FC Tatran Prešov players
ŠK Slovan Bratislava players
Widzew Łódź players
Zagłębie Sosnowiec players
Association football midfielders
Ekstraklasa players
Slovak Super Liga players
I liga players
II liga players
Expatriate footballers in Poland
Slovak expatriate sportspeople in Poland

it:Tomáš Hájovský